The Tower of Solenzara was a Genoese tower located in the commune of Sari-Solenzara on the east coast of the  Corsica. No trace of the tower survives.

The tower was one of a series of coastal defences constructed by the Republic of Genoa between 1530 and 1620 to stem the attacks by Barbary pirates.

References

Towers in Corsica